Antoine Paul Taravel, known as Xavier Privas (27 September 1863 – 6  February 1927) was a French singer, poet, goguettier and composer.

Life

Antoine Paul Taravel was born in Lyon on 27 September 1863.
He made his debut in the goguette of the Caveau Lyonnais in 1888, where he obtained great success.
He was named "prince of songwriters" in 1899.
He was a member of the Paris goguette of Le Cornet.
He died in Paris on 6 February 1927.

Since 1929 there has been a rue Xavier Privas the 5th arrondissement of Paris and in the 8th arrondissement of Lyon.

Songbooks 

Chansons chimériques, Paris, P. Ollendorff, 1897 Texte en ligne sur Gallica
Sommeil blanc, pantomime en 1 acte, argument de Xavier Privas, musique de Louis Huvey, Paris, Imprimerie E. Marcilly, 1899
Chansons vécues, Paris, P. Ollendorff, 1903 Texte en ligne sur Gallica
L'Amour chante, Paris, P. Ollendorff, 1904
Chansons des enfants du peuple, poésies et musique de Xavier Privas, Paris, J. Rueff, 1905
La Chanson sentimentale, Paris, Librairie L. Vanier, 1906 Texte en ligne sur Gallica
La Chanson des heures, poésie et musique, Paris, La Librairie mondiale, 1907 Texte en ligne sur Gallica 
Chansons enfantines, 15 chansons et rondes, avec jeux sur les rondes, avec Francine Lorée-Privas, Paris, Dorbon aîné, 1913
La Douce chanson, 50 chansons, poésie et musique, avec Francine Lorée-Privas, Paris, Dorbon aîné, 1913
Chansons françaises, poésie et musique, avec Francine Lorée-Privas, Paris, E. Figuière, 1919
Au pays des fées, avec Francine Lorée-Privas, Paris, Delagrave, 5 fasc., 1922
Trente ans de chansons, Paris, E. Figuière, 2 vol., 1927-1932
La Chanson de Lyon, Lyon, P. Masson, 1928

Recordings

References
Citations

Sources

 Grand dictionnaire encyclopédique Larousse, 1982-1985

External links
 Nécrologie
 Chanson À la plate

Musicians from Lyon
1863 births
1927 deaths
19th-century French poets
20th-century French poets
19th-century French male singers
French chansonniers
Writers from Lyon
20th-century French male singers
French male singer-songwriters